Mieh Kumeh (also Romanized as Mīeh Kūmeh) is a village in Chelevand Rural District, Lavandevil District, Astara County, Gilan Province, Iran. At the 2006 census, its population was 243, in 57 families.

Language 
Linguistic composition of the village.

References 

Populated places in Astara County

Azerbaijani settlements in Gilan Province

Talysh settlements in Gilan Province